Elections to Antrim Borough Council were held on 5 May 2005 on the same day as the other Northern Irish local government elections. The election used three district electoral areas to elect a total of 19 councillors.

Election results

Note: "Votes" are the first preference votes.

Districts summary

|- class="unsortable" align="centre"
!rowspan=2 align="left"|Ward
! % 
!Cllrs
! % 
!Cllrs
! %
!Cllrs
! %
!Cllrs
! % 
!Cllrs
! %
!Cllrs
!rowspan=2|TotalCllrs
|- class="unsortable" align="center"
!colspan=2 bgcolor="" | DUP
!colspan=2 bgcolor="" | UUP
!colspan=2 bgcolor="" | SDLP
!colspan=2 bgcolor="" | Sinn Féin
!colspan=2 bgcolor="" | Alliance
!colspan=2 bgcolor="white"| Others
|-
|align="left"|Antrim North West
|24.9
|1
|14.1
|1
|27.4
|1
|bgcolor="#008800"|28.7
|bgcolor="#008800"|2
|0.0
|0
|4.9
|0
|5
|-
|align="left"|Antrim South East
|bgcolor="#D46A4C"|34.6
|bgcolor="#D46A4C"|2
|27.4
|2
|20.0
|1
|9.0
|1
|8.3
|1
|0.7
|0
|7
|-
|align="left"|Antrim Town
|bgcolor="#D46A4C"|31.2
|bgcolor="#D46A4C"|3
|28.4
|2
|14.6
|1
|9.0
|0
|11.7
|1
|5.1
|0
|7
|-
|- class="unsortable" class="sortbottom" style="background:#C9C9C9"
|align="left"| Total
|30.7
|6
|23.8
|5
|20.5
|3
|14.8
|3
|6.9
|2
|3.3
|0
|19
|-
|}

Districts results

Antrim North West

2001: 2 x SDLP, 1 x Sinn Féin, 1 x DUP, 1 x UUP
2005: 2 x Sinn Féin, 1 x SDLP, 1 x DUP, 1 x UUP
2001-2005 Change: Sinn Féin gain from SDLP

Antrim South East

2001: 3 x UUP, 2 x DUP, 1 x SDLP, 1 x Sinn Féin
2005: 2 x DUP, 2 x UUP, 1 x SDLP, 1 x Sinn Féin, 1 x Alliance
2001-2005 Change: Alliance gain from UUP

Antrim Town

2001: 3 x UUP, 2 x DUP, 2 x SDLP
2005: 3 x DUP, 2 x UUP, 1 x SDLP, 1 x Alliance
2001-2005 Change: DUP and Alliance gain from UUP and SDLP

References

Antrim Borough Council elections
Antrim